The Petite Église was a group of French and Belgian Roman Catholics who separated from the Catholic Church in France following the Concordat of 1801 between Pope Pius VII and Napoleon Bonaparte. They were considered schismatic. One modern estimate gives its number of adherents as high as 100,000 at one time. The community declined following the death of its last episcopal adherent in 1829, and the last members submitted to the Bishop of Saint-Flour in 1911.

References

Further reading

 
 Drochon, Jean-Emmanuel B. (1894) La petite église; essai historique sur le schisme anticoncordataire. 1894. ["Le livre du Père Drochon n'a aucune valeur historique." Bricaud, p. 22.]
 
 Janssen (2006). La Petite Église en 30 questions. Geste Editions 2006. 
 
 
 Raymonde Baptiste (analysé et présenté par...) (1998) Carnet-journal de François Métay, membre de la Petite Église (1878-1883) 1998, .

External links
Union des Petites Eglises Catholiques Indépendantes a small Old Catholic jurisdiction descended from the Petite Église.

Former Christian denominations
Independent Catholic denominations
19th-century Catholicism
Religious organizations established in 1801
1801 establishments in France
Catholic Church in France